Khachin-Darbatli Mausoleum is a tomb-mausoleum of Katava Hoja the son of Musa (or Kutlu ibn Musa), located close to the Xaçındərbətli village of the Agdam District of Azerbaijan and was built by ustad Shahbenzer, in 1314. The mausoleum is located 23 km to the northern part of Agdam and is considered a notable monument of memorial architecture of medieval Azerbaijan.

The mausoleum, as well as the Agdam district, where the mausoleum is located, was under the occupation of the unrecognized Nagorno-Karabakh Republic since the First Nagorno-Karabakh war until 2020, when the district was returned to Azerbaijan per the 2020 Nagorno-Karabakh ceasefire agreement.

Architecture
Architecture and decoration of the mausoleum expand notions about the interconnection of arts of “Muslim” and “Christian” oblasts of the Near East, South Caucasus and Anatolia. It has a dodecahedral body finished with a pyramidal marquee and stands on a not small three-laddered basement.

The internal area of the mausoleum consists of a cross-shaped burial vault and an upper cell. Stalactitical branches of the cross adjoin a multitier stalactitical arch of the cell. A mihrab, which surrounds a chain of small, ornamented rosettes, is located in a shell-like multifoil conch in the southern end arch of the mausoleum.

The strictness of the arch’s interior is underlined by filigree ligature of the ornament of the biggest rosette located opposite the entry. An Arabic ligature on the aperture of the upper cell indicates a name of a buried man, construction date – the year 1314 – and a name of the architect – Shahbenzer. The mihrab and content of the ligature confirm that a “customer” was Muslim.

References

Buildings and structures completed in 1314
Islamic architecture
Mausoleums in Azerbaijan
Tourist attractions in Azerbaijan
Buildings and structures in Aghdam District